The following outline is provided as an overview of and topical guide to socialism, a range of economic and social systems characterised by social ownership of the means of production and workers' self-management as well as the political theories and movements associated with them.

Social ownership can be public, collective or cooperative ownership, or citizen ownership of equity. Socialism has numerous variants and so no single definition encapsulating all of them exists, with its definition subject to ongoing academic scrutiny and redefining, although social ownership acts as a common element shared by its various forms.

Types of socialism

Broad perspectives

Authoritarian

Barracks

Bolshevism 

Leninism - Marxism–Leninism

Other

Liberal

Libertarian

Anarchism

Libertarian socialism

Religious socialism

Nature of socialism

Defining theme 
 Social ownership

Common themes

Authoritarian socialist themes

Liberal socialist themes

Libertarian socialist themes

Market socialist themes

Non-market socialist themes

Reformist socialist themes

Revolutionary socialist themes

Socialist concepts

Regional socialism

Western

History of socialism 

 History of socialism
 History of communism

People

Socialists 
 By nationality
 Proto-socialists (16th-century socialists - 18th-century socialists)

Key figures

Socialist movements

Conflicts

Organisations

International 
 International socialist organisations

Political parties 
Socialist parties

Communist parties

Trade unions 

Trade unions

Socialist publications

Academic journals

Magazines

Newspapers

Criticisms 

 Criticisms of socialism (criticism of communist party rule - criticism of Marxism)

Related navigation boxes

References

External links 

Outlines of philosophy topics
Wikipedia outlines